Harry Rowe is the name of:
Harry Rowe (footballer) (1925–2014), Australian rules footballer
Harry Rowe (showman) (1726–1799), English showman and puppeteer

See also
Harry Rowe Shelley (1858–1947), American composer, organist and professor of music
Henry Rowe (disambiguation)